Sidhe (formerly Sidhe Interactive until 2009) is a New Zealand video game company headquartered in Wellington, and a co-founding member of the New Zealand Game Developers Association and the New Zealand Institute of Screen Innovation. Sidhe has produced more than 20 titles, including several licensed non-realistic racing games.

PikPok

The Sidhe brand was superseded in 2012 by what was a subsidiary brand, PikPok, which was an iOS and Android development team. Notable PikPok titles include Bird Strike and the Flick Kick sports arcade series of games. In September 2010, a publishing partnership between PikPok and Lexaloffle Games was announced, and the first title from that collaboration, Zen Puzzle Garden, was released in December 2010. PikPok is now the primary brand of the studio.

Both the Sidhe and PikPok brand is collected under the Prodigy Design Limited holding company.

Industry awards
PikPok received an honorable mention in the 2011 Independent Games Festival awards for Flick Kick Football, under Best Mobile Game, and Bird Strike was a finalist in the 7th annual IMG Awards (2011).

Sidhe scholarship
Sidhe offers a scholarship for students who wish to study game development at a graduate level at the Media Design School in Auckland.  At the end of 2010 Sidhe announced the Sidhe Elite financial scholarship for 2011 aiming to support young aspiring game developers. Many Media Design School graduates have gone on to work for Sidhe.

Games developed
Rugby Challenge 2: The Lions Tour Edition (consoles and Windows, 2013)
Tap Dragon Drop (iOS, 2012)
Rugby Challenge (consoles and Windows, 2011)
Blood Drive (PS3 and Xbox 360, 2010)
Rugby League 3 (Wii, 2010)
Madagascar Kartz (PS3, Xbox 360, and Wii, 2009)
Hot Wheels Battle Force 5 (Wii, 2009)
Shatter (PS3, 2009; PC, 2010)
Rugby League 2 World Cup Edition (PS2, 2008)
Speed Racer (Wii and PS2, 2008)
GripShift (PSP, PS3, Xbox 360, 2007)
Jackass: The Game (PSP and PS2, 2007)
Melbourne Cup Challenge (PC, Xbox, and PS2, 2006)
GripShift (PSP, 2005)
Rugby League 2, (PC and PS2, 2005; Xbox, 2006)
NRL Rugby League, (PC, Xbox, and PS2, 2003)Adidas Football Fever (Windows, 2002)Frogmania Deluxe (Windows)Wordjam Deluxe (Windows)Barbie Beach Vacation, (Windows, 2001)O'Neill Championship Surfer, (PlayStation, 2000)

Other games contributed to by Sidhe
 Aladdin Chess Adventures (Windows, 2004)
 Hoyle Majestic Chess (Windows, 2003)
 SpyHunter (Windows, 2003)
 Barbie Sparkling Ice Show'' (Windows, 2002)

References

External links 
 (archived)

Video game development companies
Video game companies of New Zealand
Video game companies established in 1997
Companies based in Wellington
New Zealand companies established in 1997